Acetic formic anhydride is an organic compound with the chemical formula   and a structural formula of -(C=O)-O-(C=O)H. It can be viewed as the mixed anhydride of acetic acid and formic acid.

Preparation
Acetic formic anhydride can be produced by reacting sodium formate with acetyl chloride in anhydrous diethyl ether between 23–27 °C.
It can also be prepared by the reaction of acetic anhydride and formic acid at 0 °C.

Applications
Acetic formic anhydride is a formylation agent for amines, amino acids, and alcohols. It is also a starting material for other compounds such as formyl fluoride.

See also
 Formic anhydride
 Acetic anhydride
 Acetic oxalic anhydride

References 

Carboxylic anhydrides